John Blackley (6 Jan 1862 - 10 Mar 1952) was a member of the Queensland Legislative Assembly.

Biography
Blackley was born in Scotland, and came to Australia as a young man. Settling in Maryborough, he went into business manufacturing aerated water.

In 1883 he married Elizabeth Andrew (died 1942) and together had three sons and two daughters. He died in Maryborough in March 1952 and his funeral proceeded from St Stephens Presbyterian Church to the Maryborough Cemetery.

Public career
Blackley started off in politics as an alderman on the Maryborough City Council between 1915 and 1922 and for part of that time he was the city's Mayor.

He stood as the Country and Progressive National Party candidate at the 1929 Queensland state election, but was beaten by Labor's David Weir. Weir died three months later and Blackley won the resulting by-election in October of that year, defeating Labor's Kerry Copley. He represented the electorate until the 1932 Queensland state election when he was defeated by James Stopford of the Labor Party.

References

Members of the Queensland Legislative Assembly
1862 births
1952 deaths